Maryvonne Samson Dupureur (24 May 1937 – 7 January 2008) was a French middle-distance runner. Competing in the 800 m event she won silver medals at the 1964 Olympics and 1967 European Indoor Games; she also took part in the 1960 and 1968 Olympics.

Between 1959 and 1969 Dupureur won ten national titles: six in the 800 m, three in the 400 m and one  in the 1500 m. She was an Olympic silver medalist in the 800
metres in Tokyo in 1964 after leading for most of the race but being overtaken in the final 100 metres by Great Britain’s Ann Packer, who set a new world record. Dupurer lived for many years in Brittany, and taught physical education and sport at a high school in Saint-Brieuc until her retirement.

References

External links

 Maryvonne Dupureur at sporting-heroes.net
 Death of 1964 Olympic 800m medallist Maryvonne Duperer (FRA) (EAA)
 Tokyo Olympic silver medallist Dupureur passes away (IAAF)

1937 births
2008 deaths
Sportspeople from Saint-Brieuc
Athletes (track and field) at the 1960 Summer Olympics
Athletes (track and field) at the 1964 Summer Olympics
Athletes (track and field) at the 1968 Summer Olympics
French female middle-distance runners
Olympic athletes of France
Olympic silver medalists for France
Medalists at the 1964 Summer Olympics
Olympic silver medalists in athletics (track and field)
20th-century French women